Plakinidae is a family of marine sponges. It is composed of seven genera:

Plakinidae and Oscarellidae are the two families that compose the fourth and smallest class of the porifera phylum, Homoscleromorpha.

 Aspiculophora Ruiz, Muricy, Lage, Domingos, Chenesseau & Pérez, 2017
 Aspiculophora madinina Ruiz, Muricy, Lage, Domingos, Chenesseau & Pérez, 2017 
 Corticium Schmidt, 1862
 Corticium acanthastrum Thomas, 1968
 Corticium bargibanti Lévi & Lévi, 1983
 Corticium candelabrum Schmidt, 1862
 Corticium diamantense Ereskovsky, Lavrov & Willenz, 2014
 Corticium niger Pulitzer-Finali, 1996
 Corticium quadripartitum Topsent, 1923
 Corticium simplex Lendenfeld, 1907
 Corticium vaceleti Lage, Muricy, Ruiz & Pérez, 2018
 Placinolopha Topsent, 1897
 Placinolopha acantholopha (Thomas, 1970)
 Placinolopha bedoti Topsent, 1897
 Placinolopha europae Vacelet & Vasseur, 1971
 Placinolopha moncharmonti (Sarà, 1960)
 Placinolopha sarai Lévi & Lévi, 1989
 Placinolopha spinosa Kirkpatrick, 1900
 Plakina Schulze, 1880
 Plakina anisoactina Lage, Gerovasileiou, Voultsiadou & Muricy, 2018
 Plakina anomala Lage, Gerovasileiou, Voultsiadou & Muricy, 2018
 Plakina antarctica Lendenfeld, 1907
 Plakina arletensis Ruiz, Muricy, Lage, Domingos, Chenesseau & Pérez, 2017
 Plakina atka Lehnert, Stone & Heimler, 2005
 Plakina australis (Gray, 1867)
 Plakina bioxea Green & Bakus, 1994
 Plakina bowerbanki (Sarà, 1960)
 Plakina brachylopha Topsent, 1927
 Plakina cabofriensis Muricy, Domingos, Lage, Lanna, Hardoim, Laport & Zilberberg, 2019
 Plakina coerulea Cedro, Hajdu & Correia, 2013
 Plakina corticioides Vacelet, Vasseur & Lévi, 1976
 Plakina corticolopha Lévi & Lévi, 1983
 Plakina crypta Muricy, Boury-Esnault, Bézac & Vacelet, 1998
 Plakina cyanorosea Muricy, Domingos, Lage, Lanna, Hardoim, Laport & Zilberberg, 2019
 Plakina dilopha Schulze, 1880
 Plakina doudou Grenier, Ruiz, Lage & Pérez, 2020
 Plakina elisa (de Laubenfels, 1936)
 Plakina endoumensis Muricy, Boury-Esnault, Bézac & Vacelet, 1998
 Plakina finispinata Lage, Muricy, Ruiz & Pérez, 2018
 Plakina fragilis Desqueyroux-Faúndez & van Soest, 1997
 Plakina hellenica Lage, Gerovasileiou, Voultsiadou & Muricy, 2018
 Plakina jamaicensis Lehnert & van Soest, 1998
 Plakina jani Muricy, Boury-Esnault, Bézac & Vacelet, 1998
 Plakina kanaky Ruiz & Pérez, 2015
 Plakina lendenfeldi Van Soest & Hooper, 2020
 Plakina microlobata Desqueyroux-Faúndez & van Soest, 1997
 Plakina monolopha Schulze, 1880
 Plakina muricyae Cruz-Barraza, Vega & Carballo, 2014
 Plakina nathaliae (Ereskovsky, Lavrov & Willenz, 2014)
 Plakina pacifica Desqueyroux-Faúndez & van Soest, 1997
 Plakina paradilopha Cruz-Barraza, Vega & Carballo, 2014
 Plakina reducta (Pulitzer-Finali, 1983)
 Plakina pacifica Desqueyroux-Faúndez & van Soest, 1997
 Plakina strongylata Lage, Araujo, Gerovasileiou & Muricy, 2018
 Plakina tanaga Lehnert, Stone & Heimler, 2005
 Plakina tetralopha (Hechtel, 1965)
 Plakina tetralophoides Muricy, Boury-Esnault, Bézac & Vacelet, 1998
 Plakina topsenti (Pouliquen, 1972)
 Plakina trilopha Schulze, 1880
 Plakina versatilis (Schmidt, 1880)
 Plakina weinbergi Muricy, Boury-Esnault, Bézac & Vacelet, 1998
 Plakinastrella Schulze, 1880
 Plakinastrella ceylonica (Dendy, 1905)
 Plakinastrella clathrata Kirkpatrick, 1900
 Plakinastrella clippertonensis Van Soest, Kaiser & Van Syoc, 2011
 Plakinastrella copiosa Schulze, 1880
 Plakinastrella globularis Domingos, Moraes & Muricy, 2013
 Plakinastrella mammillaris Lendenfeld, 1907
 Plakinastrella microspiculifera Moraes & Muricy, 2003
 Plakinastrella minor (Dendy, 1916)
 Plakinastrella mixta Maldonado, 1992
 Plakinastrella nicoleae Lage, Muricy, Ruiz & Pérez, 2018
 Plakinastrella onkodes Uliczka, 1929
 Plakinastrella osculifera Lage, Muricy, Ruiz & Pérez, 2018
 Plakinastrella oxeata Topsent, 1904
 Plakinastrella polysclera Lévi & Lévi, 1989
 Plakinastrella pseudolopha Lage, Muricy, Ruiz & Pérez, 2018
 Plakinastrella stinapa Van Soest, Meesters & Becking, 2014
 Plakinastrella trunculifera Topsent, 1927
 Plakortis Schulze, 1880
 Plakortis albicans Cruz-Barraza & Carballo, 2005
 Plakortis angulospiculatus (Carter, 1882)
 Plakortis badabaluensis Ubare & Mohan, 2016
 Plakortis bergquistae Muricy, 2011
 Plakortis clarionensis Cruz-Barraza, Vega & Carballo, 2014
 Plakortis communis Muricy, 2011
 Plakortis copiosa Pulitzer-Finali, 1993
 Plakortis dariae Ereskovsky, Lavrov & Willenz, 2014
 Plakortis deweerdtaephila Vicente, Zea & Hill, 2016
 Plakortis edwardsi Ereskovsky, Lavrov & Willenz, 2014
 Plakortis erythraena Lévi, 1958
 Plakortis fromontae Muricy, 2011
 Plakortis galapagensis Desqueyroux-Faúndez & van Soest, 1997
 Plakortis halichondrioides (Wilson, 1902)
 Plakortis hooperi Muricy, 2011
 Plakortis insularis Moraes & Muricy, 2003
 Plakortis japonica (Hoshino, 1977)
 Plakortis kenyensis Pulitzer-Finali, 1993
 Plakortis lita de Laubenfels, 1954
 Plakortis microrhabdifera Moraes & Muricy, 2003
 Plakortis myrae Ereskovsky, Lavrov & Willenz, 2014
 Plakortis nigra Lévi, 1953
 Plakortis petrupaulensis Domingos, Moraes & Muricy, 2013
 Plakortis potiguarensis Domingos, Moraes & Muricy, 2013
 Plakortis pulvillus Samaai, Pillay & Janson, 2019
 Plakortis quasiamphiaster Díaz & van Soest, 1994
 Plakortis ruetzleri Lage, Muricy, Ruiz & Pérez, 2018
 Plakortis simplex Schulze, 1880
 Plakortis spinalis Domingos, Moraes & Muricy, 2013
 Plakortis symbiotica Vicente, Zea & Hill, 2016
 Plakortis zyggompha (de Laubenfels, 1934)
 Tetralophophora Rützler, Piantoni, van Soest & Díaz 2014
 Tetralophophora mesoamericana Rützler, Piantoni, van Soest & Díaz 2014

References

Homoscleromorpha
Sponge families